The 2019 Football Federation South Australia season was the 113th season of soccer in South Australia, and the seventh under the National Premier Leagues format.

2019 National Premier Leagues South Australia

The 2019 National Premier Leagues South Australia season was played over 22 rounds, beginning on 22 February with the regular season concluding on 17 August.

League table

Matches

Finals

Top Goalscorers

2019 South Australian State League 1

Promotion to the 2020 NPL was awarded to the Premiers (highest placed team during the regular season), as well as the Champions (winner of the Grand Final).

League table

Finals

Top Goalscorers

2019 South Australian State League 2

Promotion to the 2020 State League 1 was awarded to the Premiers (highest placed team during the regular season), as well as the Champions (winner of the Grand Final).

League table

Finals

Top Goalscorers

2019 Women's NPL

The highest tier domestic football competition in South Australia for women was known for sponsorship reasons as the PS4 Women's National Premier League. This was the fourth season of the NPL format. The 8 teams played a triple round-robin for a total of 21 games.

Cup competitions

2019 Federation Cup

South Australian soccer clubs competed in 2019 for the Federation Cup. Clubs entered from the NPL SA, the State League 1, State League 2, South Australian Amateur Soccer League and South Australian Collegiate Soccer League. 

This knockout competition was won by Adelaide Olympic. 

The competition also served as the South Australian preliminary rounds for the 2019 FFA Cup. In addition to Adelaide Olympic, A-League club Adelaide United qualified for the final rounds, entering at the Round of 32.

References

2019 in Australian soccer
Football South Australia seasons